Mount Ayliff Hospital is a Provincial government funded hospital in Mount Ayliff in the Alfred Nzo District of the Eastern Cape Province of South Africa.

The hospital departments include Audiology, Emergency department, Paediatric ward, Maternity ward, Out Patients Department, Surgical Services, Medical Services, Operating Theatre & CSSD Services, Dentistry, Ophthalmology, Pharmacy, Anti-Retroviral (ARV) treatment for HIV/AIDS, Post Trauma Counseling Services, Termination of Pregnancy Services, X-ray Services, Physiotherapy, Occupational Health Services, Laundry, Kitchen Services and Mortuary.

References 
 Mount Ayliff Hospital

Hospitals in the Eastern Cape
Alfred Nzo District Municipality